In enzymology, a leucine—tRNA ligase is an enzyme that catalyzes the chemical reaction

ATP + L-leucine + tRNALeu  AMP + diphosphate + L-leucyl-tRNALeu

The 3 substrates of this enzyme are ATP, L-leucine, and tRNA(Leu), whereas its 3 products are AMP, diphosphate, and L-leucyl-tRNA(Leu).

This enzyme belongs to the family of ligases, to be specific those forming carbon-oxygen bonds in aminoacyl-tRNA and related compounds.  The systematic name of this enzyme class is L-leucine:tRNALeu ligase (AMP-forming). Other names in common use include leucyl-tRNA synthetase, leucyl-transfer ribonucleate synthetase, leucyl-transfer RNA synthetase, leucyl-transfer ribonucleic acid synthetase, leucine-tRNA synthetase, and leucine translase.  This enzyme participates in valine, leucine and isoleucine biosynthesis and aminoacyl-trna biosynthesis.

Structural studies

See also
Leucyl-tRNA synthetase

References

 
 
 

EC 6.1.1
Enzymes of known structure